The Chile women's national cricket team, nicknamed Las Loicas, represents the country of Chile in women's cricket matches.

In April 2018, the International Cricket Council (ICC) granted full Women's Twenty20 International (WT20I) status to all its members. Therefore, all Twenty20 matches played between Chile women and another international side after 1 July 2018 were a full WT20I.

International Cricket
Chile's first WT20I matches were contested as part of the South American Women's Championships in August 2018 against Brazil, Mexico and Peru however Peru's matches were not classified as WT20Is as not all of their players met the ICC residency requirements. Chile won four matches and lost two to finish second on the table. In the final against Brazil, Chile lost by a margin of 92 runs.

Tournament history

South American Cricket Championship
 2018: Runners-up
 2019: Group Stage

Records and Statistics 
International Match Summary — Chile Women
 
Last updated 6 October 2019

Twenty20 International 

 Highest team total: 147/5 (16 overs) v. Mexico on 4 October 2019 at Lima Cricket and Football Club, Lima.
 Highest individual score: 30, Nicole Conejeros v. Mexico on 24 August  2018 at Los Pinos Polo Club 2, Bogotá.
 Best individual bowling figures: 4/11, Jessica Miranda v. Mexico on 26 August  2018 at Los Pinos Polo Club 2, Bogotá.

T20I record versus other nations

Records complete to WT20I #785. Last updated 6 October 2019.

See also
 List of Chile women Twenty20 International cricketers
 Chile national cricket team

References

 
Women's
Women's national cricket teams